The Scouting and Guiding movement in Mexico consists of several independent organizations.

Organizations
 Asociación de Scouts de México, Asociación Civil, member of the World Organization of the Scout Movement
 Guías de México, member of the World Association of Girl Guides and Girl Scouts
 Agrupación Scout Mexicana, A. C., a member of the World Federation of Independent Scouts
 Federación Mexicana de Scouts Independientes, A. C., a member of the World Federation of Independent Scouts
 Scouts y Guías Baden Powell, A. C.
 independent local groups
 Scouts Mexicanos, A. C., member of the Order of World Scouts
 Asociación de Grupos de Scouts de México, A.C..

International Scouting in Mexico
 WAGGGS' World Centre Our Cabaña, in Cuernavaca, Mexico, opened in 1957. In addition, there are American Boy Scouts in Mexico City and Chihuahua, linked to the Direct Service branch of the Boy Scouts of America, which supports units around the world.

External links

 ASMAC Home Page
 Federación Mexicana de Scouts Independientes